Amber Oak is a Swedish band from Skellefteå, which was formed in 2008 by Erik Ekersund, Joseph Dahlberg and Albin Marklund. The band is signed to the Skellefteå-based record label A West Side Fabrication. Jonathan Eriksson and Alec Hofverberg joined in 2009 and then the band was complete.

History 
The band began its journey with the release of their EP "Your Missing Piece" on A West Side Fabrication 2009. The song "Audrey", who was played on various Swedish radio stations, was featured on "Your Missing Piece".
2011 the band released their debut album "Illt" which received good reviews in Swedish media.
They also released the single "Words" in the same year that had a heavy rotation on various Swedish radio stations.

Members 
 Jonathan Eriksson - vocals
 Joseph Dahlberg - guitar and backup vocals
 Alec Hofverberg - bass
 Erik Ekersund - drums and percussion

Discography 
 2009 - Your Missing Piece EP
 2011 - Illt
 2011 - Words (Single)
 2013 - Ambivalence EP

Swedish indie pop groups
Musical groups established in 2008